Halswell Tynte may refer to:
 Sir Halswell Tynte, 1st Baronet  (1649–1702) MP for Bridgwater
 Sir Halswell Tynte, 3rd Baronet (1705-1730) MP for Bridgwater